Stan Getz and the Oscar Peterson Trio is a 1958 studio album by Stan Getz, accompanied by the Oscar Peterson Trio.

Track listing
 "I Want to Be Happy" (Irving Caesar, Vincent Youmans) – 7:35
 "Pennies from Heaven" (Arthur Johnston, Johnny Burke)  – 5:16
 Ballad Medley: "Bewitched, Bothered and Bewildered"/"I Don't Know Why (I Just Do)"/"How Long Has This Been Going On?"/"I Can't Get Started"/"Polka Dots and Moonbeams" (Richard Rodgers, Lorenz Hart)/(Fred E. Ahlert, Roy Turk)/(George Gershwin, Ira Gershwin)/(Vernon Duke, I. Gershwin)/(Jimmy Van Heusen, Burke)  – 10:10
 "I'm Glad There Is You" (Jimmy Dorsey, Paul Mertz) – 4:38
 "Tour's End" (Stan Getz)  – 4:55
 "I Was Doing All Right" (G. Gershwin, I. Gershwin)  – 4:08
 "Bronx Blues"  (Getz)  – 5:31

Bonus tracks on CD reissue:
"Three Little Words" (Bert Kalmar, Harry Ruby)  – 6:35
 "Detour Ahead" (Lou Carter, Herb Ellis, John Frigo)  – 3:36
 "Sunday" (Chester Conn, Benny Krueger, Ned Miller, Jule Styne)  – 6:08
 "Blues for Herky" (Getz) – 3:45

Personnel

Performance
 Stan Getz – tenor saxophone
 Oscar Peterson – piano
 Herb Ellis – guitar
 Ray Brown – double bass

Production
 Nat Hentoff - liner notes
 Norman Granz - producer

Re-releases
1990, (CD) Verve, Cat: 8278262
2015, (CD) Crackerjack Records, with bonus tracks "Candy" and "When Your Lover Has Gone" same personnel plus Gerry Mulligan (baritone saxophone), Harry "Sweets" Edison (trumpet) and Louie Bellson (drums), recorded Los Angeles, August 1, 1957)
2017, (LP) Jazz Images, Cat: LPJIM 37048

References 

1958 albums
Stan Getz albums
Oscar Peterson albums
Verve Records albums
Albums produced by Norman Granz

Albums recorded at Capitol Studios